Peace II is an oil on canvas painting by German American artist George Grosz, created in 1946. It his held at the Whitney Museum of American Art, in New York.

Description
Grosz was living in the United States since 1933, when the World War II finished in 1945, and would only return to his native Germany in 1959, shortly before his death. This was the second version that he did of a painting where he perceived the state where Germany was after the end of the world-wide conflict. The painting does have an apocalyptic atmosphere, being dominated by dark and reddish colours, which suggest a warlike scenario, with ongoing bombings or fires and destruction. The artist depicts himself at the center of the composition, as a grim figure, apparently wearing a uniform, emerging from the ruins of a building, surrounded by rubble, like if he was a survivor in a devastated world. The work can be interpreted as a mourning for his mother, who had died during the late conflict, and for the current state of Germany.

References

1946 paintings
Paintings by George Grosz
War paintings
Paintings in the collection of the Whitney Museum of American Art